David Lowry is a British research consultant with specialist knowledge of UK and EU nuclear and environment policy.

Early life and education

Lowry is a contributing author to a 2007 book on British energy choices entitled Nuclear or Not? In 2001, Lowry was presented with a special award for education at the Nuclear-Free Future Foundation annual awards.  In 1987, Lowry was awarded a PhD on nuclear decision-making by the Open University. He previously studied at the State University of New York (1978–79) and the London School of Economics (1975–78).

Boards
He has been a member of the Secretary of State for Energy & Climate Change's Geological Disposal Implementation Board for Radioactive Waste since 2010.

Publications
Lowry has published a large number of articles in a range of magazines since 1980. In 1991 he co-authored a book, The International Politics of Nuclear Waste, covering France, Germany, Sweden, UK and US, published by Macmillan Press. His research and advocacy on nuclear and environmental issues has received media coverage.

References

External links
The conspiracy theorists may be close to the truth
Glowing for gold
The nuclear industry's secret subsidies

Living people
British anti–nuclear power activists
Year of birth missing (living people)